Joy Thompson (born Joy Gardiner-Garden, 1923, died 2018) was an Australian botanist. Her main research areas were taxonomy and Myrtaceae.

Life & Career

Thompson's university studies occurred during the second world war and in university vacations she worked in the Land Army near Maitland. She graduated in 1946 with a B.Sc. (Agric) from the University of Sydney, and went to work at the New South Wales Herbarium (then a part of the NSW department of Agriculture).  She was Honorary Secretary of the Systematic Botany Committee of ANZAAS from 1952 to 1954.

In 1956 she married Max Thompson and, as a public servant, resigned from her position as was required at the time. Ten years later, after the birth of her two children, she returned to work at the Herbarium, in a part-time position. On her retirement in 1982, she became an Honorary Research Associate, and until 2009, continued to work in this role, making the 2.5 hour train journey from Mittagong once a week.

Some publications 

 1993. A revision of the genus Swainsona (Fabaceae). Telopea 5(3): 427-581
 1992. (with J. Everett) New alpine and subalpine species in Craspedia sens. strict. (Asteraceae: Gnaphalieae). Telopea 5(1): 45-51
 1991. Swainsona pyrophila (Fabaceae), a new name and synonymisation. Telopea 4(2): 359-359
 1990. New species and new combinations in the genus Swainsona (Fabaceae) in New South Wales. Telopea 4(1): 1-5
 1989. (with J.R. Clarkson) A revision of the genus Neofabricia (Myrtaceae). Telopea 3(3): 291-300
 1989. A revision of the genus Leptospermum (Myrtaceae). Telopea 3(3): 301-449
 1986. (with L.A.S. Johnson) Callitris glaucophylla Australia's 'White Cypress Pine' - a new name for an old species. Telopea 2(6): 731-736
 1983. Redefinitions and nomenclatural changes within the Leptospermum suballiance of Myrtaceae. Telopea 2(4): 379-383
 1981. A key to the plants of the subalpine and alpine zones of the Kosciusko region. Telopea 2(3): 219-297
 1981. (with Max Gray)A check-list of the subalpine and alpine species found in the Kosciusko region of New South Wales. Telopea 2(3): 299-346
1976. A Revision of the Genus Tetratheca (Tremandraceae). Telopea 1(3): 139-215

Books 
 1993. A Revision of the Genus Swainsona (Fabaceae). Telopea (Sydney) 5 (3): 156 pp.
 1986. A Revision of the Genus Leptospermum: Including a Discussion of the Variation Contained Within the Genus and Its Probable Significance as Indicating the Origin, Subsequent Evolution and Spread of the Group. Editor Univ. of Sydney, 678 pp.
 1978. Polygalaceae. Flora of New South Wales 112: 118 pp.
1961. Papilionaceae. Flora of New South Wales 101: 91 pp.

Honours

Eponymy 
 (Oxalidaceae) Oxalis thompsoniae B.J.Conn & P.G.Richards
 (Poaceae) Agrostis thompsoniae S.W.L.Jacobs

References

External links 

20th-century Australian botanists
2018 deaths
1923 births
University of Sydney alumni
20th-century Australian women scientists